Connor Behan is a Grand Prix motorcycle racer from Great Britain. Connor has in 2013 taken to road racing competing for the KMR Kawasaki powered by Vauxhall team and has achieved many a top result including finishing in second place in the newcomers A Manx Grand Prix race. He previously rode for Emerald Road Racing aboard Kawasaki machines.

In 2019 Behan was convicted of dangerous driving offences.

Career statistics

By season

Races by year

References

External links
 Profile on motogp.com
https://www.chesterstandard.co.uk/news/17342054.ex-motorbike-racer-connor-behan-jailed-for-dangerous-driving/
https://www.visordown.com/news/general/former-irish-road-racing-champion-jailed-dangerous-driving

British motorcycle racers
Living people
1991 births
125cc World Championship riders